Chalcosyrphus (Xylotomima) anthreas, the Yellow-banded Leafwalker, is a rare species of syrphid fly found in eastern North America.  Hoverflies can remain nearly motionless in flight. The adults are also known as flower flies for they are commonly found on flowers, from which they get both energy-giving nectar and protein-rich pollen.

Distribution
Canada, United States

References

Eristalinae
Insects described in 1849
Diptera of North America
Hoverflies of North America
Taxa named by Francis Walker (entomologist)